Lechritrochoceratidae is a family of derived tarphycerids from the middle and upper Silurian, once included in the now largely abandoned Barrandeocerida.

Description
Lechritrochoceratidae comprise dextrally torticonic genera with costate shells and ventrally displaced siphuncles. Offset coiling in low spired. Rate of expansion and coarseness of costae vary, genus to genus. Costae are generally narrow and sharp with wide areas between and slant dorso-ventrally toward the apex.

Genera
Six genera have been described:

References

 Sweet, Walter C. 1964.  Nautiloidea -Barrandeocerida. Treatise on Invertebrate Paleontology, Part K. Geological Soc. of America and Univ of Kansas press.
 Lechritrochoceratidae -Paleodb

Nautiloids
Prehistoric nautiloid families
Silurian first appearances
Silurian extinctions